Francisco de Assis Rosa e Silva (4 October 1857 – 1 July 1929) was a Brazilian politician who was the third vice president of Brazil from 15 November 1898 to 15 November 1902 under Manuel Ferraz de Campos Sales. As Vice President, he also served as the President of the Senate. He served as the President of the Chamber of Deputies from 1894 to 1896.

References

External links

1857 births
1929 deaths
20th-century Brazilian people
Vice presidents of Brazil
Presidents of the Federal Senate (Brazil)
Presidents of the Chamber of Deputies (Brazil)
Politicians from Recife

Candidates for Vice President of Brazil